The Kaj Mosque is a historical mosque in the Isfahan province, in Iran. The mosque is located 24 km east of Isfahan on the northern bank of Zayandeh Rud. From the mosque, it is remained now only some half-ruined walls and a dome. It dates back to the Ilkhanid era. Brick is the most important construction material for this structure and even the inner decorations are of bricks. The mosque had probably a minaret in the past, but there is no trace of it now.

References 

Mosques in Isfahan Province
13th-century mosques
Buildings and structures in Isfahan Province
Kaj